A97 or A-97 may refer to:

 A97 road (Scotland)
 Dutch Defence, in the Encyclopaedia of Chess Openings